Gastrimargus marmoratus is a species of band-winged grasshopper in the family Acrididae. It is found in southern Africa, Indomalaya, and eastern Asia.

References

External links

 

Oedipodinae
Insects described in 1815
Orthoptera of Asia
Orthoptera of Africa